Gekko similignum is a species of gecko. It is endemic to Hainan.

References

Gekko
Reptiles of China
Endemic fauna of Hainan
Reptiles described in 1923
Taxa named by Malcolm Arthur Smith